Jonathan Oberlander is a professor of social medicine at the University of North Carolina at Chapel Hill and author of the 2003 book The Political Life of Medicare.

References

External links
University of North Carolina at Chapel Hill — Jonathan Oberlander
Interview — Fresh Air

Living people
University of North Carolina at Chapel Hill faculty
American political scientists
Year of birth missing (living people)